L. A. Westermann Co. v. Dispatch Printing Co., 249 U.S. 100 (1919), was a United States Supreme Court case in which the Court held that penalties awarded "in lieu of actual damages and profits" cannot be less than $250 for each case of copyright infringement.

References

External links
 

1919 in United States case law
United States Supreme Court cases
United States Supreme Court cases of the White Court
United States copyright case law